is a former Japanese football player and manager.

Playing career
Nomura was born in Hiroshima on February 10, 1940. He played at Chuo University and won 1962 Emperor's Cup with Aritatsu Ogi, Yasuyuki Kuwahara and so on. After graduating from university, he joined Hitachi in 1963. In 1965, he played 14 games and scored 15 goals in Japan Soccer League first season. He became first top scorer. In 1972 season, the club won the championship. He was also elected Best Eleven and Japanese Footballer of the Year award. He retired in 1975.

Coaching career
In 1974, Nomura playing for Hitachi also became an assistant coach for the club. In 1979, he became a manager for Hitachi. In 1981, he resigned. In 2014, he was selected Japan Football Hall of Fame.

Honours 
Team
 Japan Soccer League Division 1 - 1 (1972)
Individual
 Japan Soccer League top scorer - 1 (1965)
 Japanese Footballer of the Year - 1 (1972)

References

External links
Japan Football Hall of Fame at Japan Football Association

1940 births
Living people
Chuo University alumni
Association football people from Hiroshima Prefecture
Japanese footballers
Association football forwards
Japan Soccer League players
Kashiwa Reysol players
Japanese football managers